Clara Kimball Young (born Edith Matilda Clara Kimball;
September 6, 1890 – October 15, 1960) was an American film actress who was popular in the early silent film era.

Early life 

Edith Matilda Clara Kimball was born in Chicago on September 6, 1890, the only child to Edward Kimball and Pauline Madeline Kimball (née Garrette, 1860–1919), both of whom were traveling stock actors. She made her stage debut at the age of three, and throughout her early childhood traveled with her parents and acted with their theater company. She attended St. Francis Xavier Academy in Chicago. Afterward, she was hired into a stock company and resumed her stage career, traveling extensively through the United States and playing in various small town theaters.

Early in her career, she met and married a fellow stock company and known Broadway actor named James Young. Young's previous wife had been the songwriter/lyricist Rida Johnson Young. After sending a photograph to Vitagraph Studios, Clara Kimball Young, as she was then known, and her husband were both offered yearly contracts in 1912.

Career 

In the new medium of motion pictures, and without much screen competition, Young's star at Vitagraph rose quickly. Young was predominantly cast in one- and two-reel roles as the virtuous heroine. By 1913, she had become one of the more popular leading ladies at Vitagraph and placed at number 17 in a poll of public popularity. Many of Young's films from her early period with Vitagraph are now lost.

In 1914, Vitagraph released the drama My Official Wife, which starred Young as a Russian revolutionary and was directed by her husband James Young and co-starred the popular leading man Earle Williams. The film, which is now lost, was an enormous success and launched Young and Earle Williams into first place in the popularity polls, and Young immediately was signed to a contract with pioneering mogul Lewis J. Selznick.

After a string of successful roles, Young was established as one of the chief attractions of World Film Corporation and her husband James was now a much sought-after director. By 1915, Young's popularity was equivalent to that of Mary Pickford, Dorothy and Lillian Gish, Pearl White, Edna Purviance, and Mabel Normand.

She became involved in a much publicized affair with Selznick, culminating in a 1916 divorce suit accusing her of alienation of affection. James Young finally obtained a final decree on April 8, 1919, on grounds of desertion.

Selznick quickly formed the Clara Kimball Young Film Corporation, installing himself as president, and formed Selznick Productions to distribute her films and those of some other independent producers. After only four films with Selznick however, the personal and business relationship began to sour, and Young struggled to extricate herself from all business arrangements with Selznick, accusing him of defrauding her of her profits through a series of dummy corporations and by electing himself president of her company while not permitting her any input in her business affairs.

In 1917, Young became involved in an affair with Harry Garson, with whom she then teamed in a business venture. Garson had little experience in the motion picture business, and as a result, Young's career began to sputter. Although she remained a popular actress into the early 1920s, Young suffered at the inexperience and alleged mismanagement and apathy of Garson. In her 1921 diary, Young wrote "It will be wonderful to get out of debt and finish these three pictures for equity. I feel as though I had my head on a block and was waiting for the axe to descend at any moment."

She began suffering a series of press attacks for her business dealings and personal relationship with Garson. By 1925, her stardom began to fade, and she made her last silent film Lying Wives. Young spent the remainder of the 1920s performing in vaudeville, and in 1928 quietly married Dr. Arthur Fauman. The advent of sound briefly revived her career, and she appeared in several featured roles for RKO Radio Pictures and Tiffany Pictures with only modest success, appearing only in bit parts including a Three Stooges short, and extra roles in mostly lower budget pictures and having a stint on radio. One of her bigger roles is in the murder mystery The Rogues Tavern (1936) where she plays a sweet but fussy motherly woman who is hiding a very big secret.

She retired from acting in 1941.

Death 
Young underwent minor surgery to correct a chronic bronchial problem in March 1960. She did not recover her health after the surgery, and became increasingly frail. Young died of a stroke at the Motion Picture House in Woodland Hills, California on October 15, 1960. Her remains were cremated, and she was interred at Grand View Memorial Park Cemetery in Glendale, California.
For her contribution to the motion picture industry, Young was given a star on the Hollywood Walk of Fame at 6513 Hollywood Blvd.

Selected filmography 

 Washington Under the British Flag (1909, short)
 Washington Under the American Flag (1909, short)
 A Midsummer Night's Dream (1909, short) as Penelope
 Richelieu; or: The Conspiracy (1910, short)
 Uncle Tom's Cabin (1910, short)
 The Sepoy's Wife (1910, short) as The Sepoy's Wife
 Ransomed; or, A Prisoner of War (1910, short) as Captain Jack's Wife
 The Last of the Saxons (1910, short) as Aldyth
 Lady Godiva (1911, short)
 Cardinal Wolsey (1912, short) as Anne Boleyn
 The Haunted Rocker (1912, short) as Madge Boggs, the Daughter
 The Jocular Winds of Fate (1912, short) as Alice De Voe
 The Pipe (1912, short) as Dingley's Wife
 The Old Kent Road (1912, short) as Sue Simmonds, Their Daughter
 Dr. LaFleur's Theory (1912, short) as the Criminal's Moll
 Professor Optimo (1912, short) as Clara
 The Picture Idol (1912, short) as Beth Ward, a Passionate Fan of Howard Hanson's
 Mockery (1912, short) as Princess Dolorosa
 Half a Hero (1912) as Mabel Kemp
 Lulu's Doctor (1912, short) as Aunt Madge Marion
 When Roses Wither (1912, short) as Howard's Wife
 Lincoln's Gettysburys Address (1912, short)
 The Troublesome Step-Daughters (1912, short) as an Assistant in the Toy Shop
 The Money Kings (1912, short)
 A Lively Affair (1912, short) as Dorothy, the Maid
 Rock of Ages (1912, short)
 Wanted, a Sister (1912, short) as Evelyn Marshall
 Popular Betty (1912, short) as Betty Wilson
 A Vitagraph Romance (1912, short) as Caroline, the Senator's Daughter
 The Irony of Fate (1912, short)
 Mrs. Lirriper's Lodgers (1912, short) as Mrs. Edson
 A Mistake in Spelling (1912, short) as Mabel Moore, Fred's Fiancée
 Poet and Peasant (1912, short) as Toinette Savard, the Daughter
 Lord Browning and Cinderella (1912, short) as Cinderella
 In the Flat Above (1912, short) as Priscilla Putnam, a Music Teacher
 The Eavesdropper (1912, short) as Alice
 Love Hath Wrought a Miracle (1913, short) as Rose Graham
 The Little Minister (1913, short) as Lady Babbie
 The Interrupted Honeymoon (1913, short) as Mrs. Adele Young, the Wife
 What a Change of Clothes Did (1913, short) as John Mason's Fiancée
 The Volunteer Strike Breakers (1913, short) as Harris's Fiancée
 When Mary Grew Up (1913, short) as Mary
 Beau Brummel (1913, short) as Helen Ballarat
 The Old Guard (1913, short) as Melanie
 Put Yourself in Their Place (1913, short) as Mr. Kent's Daughter
 The Way Out (1913, short) as Emma Bindley – a Spinster
 Getting Up a Practice (1913, short) as Emily Irving, Dr. Lyons' Sweetheart
 The Mystery of the Stolen Child (1913, short) as The Nurse
 Mr. Mintern's Misadventures (1913, short) as Muriel Leach
 The Mystery of the Stolen Jewels (1913, short) as First Thief
 The Wrath of Osaka (1913, short) as Miro
 The White Slave; or, The Octoroon (1913, short) as Zoe – the Octoroon
 Delayed Proposals (1913, short) as Marion Van Sicklen
 Jack's Chrysanthemum (1913, short) as Kichimatsu, a Japanese Maiden
 The Spirit of the Orient (1913, short) as Normallee
 The Taming of Betty (1913, short) as Betty
 A Faithful Servant (1913, short) as Nina, Count Gullio's Sweetheart
 A Maid of Mandalay (1913, short) as Ma May
 The Lonely Princess (1913, short) as The Princess, Prince Raffaello's Daughter
 When Women Go on the Warpath; or, Why Jonesville Went Dry (1913, short) as Minor Role
 Cupid Versus Women's Rights (1913, short) as Madge Trenton
 The Hindoo Charm (1913, short) as Phyllis – the Step-Mother
 John Tobin's Sweetheart (1913, short) as Minor Role
 Extremities (1913, short) as Gladys Robinson
 The Test (1913, short) as Eleanor Anstruther
 The Pirates (1913, short) as Helen Merwin
 On Their Wedding Eve (1913, short) as Edna Morvell
 Jerry's Mother-In-Law (1913, short) as Jerry's Wife
 Fellow Voyagers (1913, short) as Jerry's Wife
 Betty in the Lions' Den (1913, short) as Betty
 A Lesson in Jealousy (1913, short) as Mabel – the Wife
 Beauty Unadorned (1913, short) as Helen Preston
 Love's Sunset (1913, short) as Nita Travers
 Up in a Balloon (1913, short) as Betty Simpson
 The Perplexed Bridegroom (1914, short) as Lucy Demly, the Bride
 Goodness Gracious (1914, short) as Gwendoline
 Some Steamer Scooping (1914, short) as Clara Lane, a Journalist
 Her Husband (1914, short) as Dora Allen, Mrs. Tom Harcourt
 The Silver Snuff Box (1914, short) as Amy, Julian's Granddaughter
 The Awakening of Barbara Dare (1914, short) as Dorothy Clayton
 The Violin of M'sieur (1914, short) as Yvonne – Gerome's Daughter
 Happy-Go-Lucky (1914, short) as Happy-Go-Lucky
 My Official Wife (1914) as Helene Marie
 David Garrick (1914, short) as Ada Ingot
 Taken by Storm (1914, short) as Betty, the Willful Wife
 The Fates and Flora Fourflush (1914) as Flora Fourflush
 Lola (1914) as Lola Barnhelun
 The Deep Purple (1915) as Doris Moore
 Hearts in Exile (1915) as Hope Ivanovna
 Marrying Money (1915) as Mildred Niles
 Trilby (1915) as Trilby O'Ferral
 The Heart of the Blue Ridge (1915) as Plutina
 Camille (1915) as Camille
 The Yellow Passport (1916) as Sonia Sokoloff
 The Feast of Life (1916) as Aurora Fernandez
 The Dark Silence (1916) as Mildred White
 The Foolish Virgin (1916) as Mary Adams
 The Common Law (1916) as Valerie West
 The Rise of Susan (1916) as Susan
 A Race for Life (1916, short)
 The Price She Paid (1917) as Mildred Gower
 The Easiest Way (1917) as Laura Murdock
 Magda (1917) as Magda
 Shirley Kaye (1917) as Shirley Kaye
 The Marionettes (1918) as Fernande de Monclars
 The House of Glass (1918) as Margaret Case
 The Reason Why (1918) as Zara Zenova
The Claw (1918) as Mary Saurin
The Savage Woman (1918) as Renee Benoit
 The Road Through the Dark (1918) as Gabrielle Jardee
 Cheating Cheaters (1919) as Ruth Brockton
 The Better Wife (1919) as Charmian Page
 Eyes of Youth (1919) as Gina Ashling
 Soldiers of Fortune (1919) (uncredited)
 The Forbidden Woman (1920) as Diane Sorel
 For the Soul of Rafael (1920)  as Marta Raquel Estevan
 Mid-Channel (1920) as Zoe Blundell
 Hush (1921) as Vera Stanford
 Straight from Paris (1921) as Lucette Grenier
 Charge It (1921) as Julia Lawrence
 What No Man Knows (1921) as Norma Harvey
 The Worldly Madonna (1922) as Lucy Trevor, Dancer/Janet Trevor, Nun
 The Hands of Nara (1922) as Nara Alexieff
 Enter Madame (1922) as Prima Donna Lisa Della Robia
 The Woman of Bronze (1923) as Vivian Hunt
 Cordelia the Magnificent (1923) as Cordelia Marlowe
 A Wife's Romance (1923) as Joyce Addisonn
 Lying Wives (1925) as Patricia Chase
 Kept Husbands (1931) as Mrs. Henrietta Post
 Mother and Son (1931) as Faro Lil
 Women Go on Forever (1931) as Daisy Bowman
 Love Bound (1932) as Mrs. Jane Randolph
 Probation (1932) as Mrs. Humphries
 File 113 (1933) as Mme. Fauvel
 I Can't Escape (1934) as Mrs. Wilson
 Romance in the Rain (1934) as Mlle. Fleurette Malevinsky
 The Return of Chandu (1934) as Dorothy Regent
 The Drunkard (1935) as Mrs. Karns
 Hollywood Extra Girl (1935, documentary short) as Grace
 She Married Her Boss (1935) as Parsons
 His Night Out (1935) as Mrs. Davis
 Fighting Youth (1935) as Mrs. Stewart, House Mother
 The Fighting Coward (1935) as Mrs. Gordon
 Ants in the Pantry (1936, 3 Stooges short) as Mrs. Beulah Burlap
 Dangerous Waters (1936) as Kind Lady Passenger (uncredited)
 Love in September (1936, short) as Mrs. Thompson
 Three on the Trail (1936) as Rose Peters
 The Rogues Tavern (1936) as Mrs. Jamison
 Oh, Susanna (1936) as Aunt Peggy Lee
 The Black Coin (1936) as Donna Luise Navarro
 They Wanted to Marry (1937) as Wedding Guest Talking to Hunter (uncredited)
 New News (1937, short) as Mrs. Van Gage
 Hills of Old Wyoming (1937) as Ma Hutchins
 Dangerously Yours (1937) as Mrs. Prentiss (uncredited)
 The Mysterious Pilot (1937, Serial) as Martha, Fritz's Wife [Chs.3-5,9,14-15]
 The Secret of Treasure Island (1938, Serial) as Cortez Hotel Maid (uncredited)
 The Wages of Sin (1938) as Fat Pearl
 The Frontiersmen (1938) as Mrs. Peters
 The Round Up (1941) as Mrs. Wilson
 Mr. Celebrity (1941) as Herself (final film role)

Gallery

References

External links 

 
 Clara Kimball Young at the Women Film Pioneers Project
 
 The Clara Kimball Young Website
 Silent Era People
 Silent era pose of Clara Kimball Young (moviecard)

1890 births
1960 deaths
Actresses from Chicago
American film actresses
American silent film actresses
Vaudeville performers
20th-century American actresses
Women film pioneers
Burials at Grand View Memorial Park Cemetery